The Mindanao pygmy babbler (Dasycrotapha plateni) is a bird species endemic to the Philippines. It had been placed in the family Timaliidae, but it is a close relative of the white-eyes, however, and many taxonomists now place it in the family Zosteropidae.

The Visayan pygmy babbler was formerly included here as a subspecies, but is usually recognized as a distinct species S. pygmaea today. Together, they were simply called "pygmy babbler".

Its natural habitats are tropical moist lowland forests and tropical moist montane forests up to 1,100 meters above sea level. It is often seen in mixed flocks with other forest birds. It has been classified by the IUCN as Near-threatened  due to habitat loss.

The scientific name commemorates the German zoologist Carl Constantin Platen.

Gallery

References

 BirdLife International 2004.  Stachyris plateni.   2006 IUCN Red List of Threatened Species.   Downloaded on 27 July 2007.
 Collar, N. J. & Robson, C. 2007. Family Timaliidae (Babblers)  pp. 70 – 291 in; del Hoyo, J., Elliott, A. & Christie, D.A. eds. Handbook of the Birds of the World, Vol. 12. Picathartes to Tits and Chickadees. Lynx Edicions, Barcelona.
Moyle, R. G., C. E. Filardi, C. E. Smith, and J. Diamond. 2009. Explosive Pleistocene diversification and hemispheric expansion of a "great speciator." Proceedings of the National Academy of Sciences of the United States of America 106: 1863–1868.
Allen, D, 2020, Birds of the Philippines p298-299

Mindanao pygmy babbler
Birds of Mindanao
Mindanao pygmy babbler
Mindanao pygmy babbler
Taxonomy articles created by Polbot